Primate Mindstate is the second extended play by American rapper Apathy. It was released on August 23, 2011 through Demigodz Records as a Bonus disc to his third studio album, Honkey Kong. The EP is mostly produced by Apathy, though one track is produced by MoSS.

Track listing

Samples
"East Coast Rapist"
"Don't You (Forget About Me)" by Simple Minds
"Make Alotta Money"
"River" by Joni Mitchell
"Smoke Weed Everybody"
"Eyes Without a Face" by Billy Idol
"The Next Episode" by Dr. Dre

References

Demigodz Records albums
Apathy (rapper) albums
2011 EPs